Steven Beckwith Ayres (October 27, 1861 – June 1, 1929) was an American politician and a U.S. Representative from New York.

Biography
Born in Fort Dodge, Iowa, Ayres was the son of Stephen and Artemisia (Dunlap) Ayres. He moved with his parents to Elmira, New York, in 1866, where he attended grammar school. He moved to Penn Yan, New York in 1873, and attended the Penn Yan Academy. He graduated from Syracuse University in 1882.

He married his first wife, Harriet Margaret Bowers of Penn Yann, NY, in 1884. They had one son, Malcolm Beckwith Ayres (b.1886). His second wife, Helen Ayres (b.1869), was one of the founders of the Woman's National Democratic League (est.1896) in New York City. It was the first permanent national political organization exclusively established for and by women.  They had one daughter, Janette.

Career
Ayres  worked in the publishing business at Penn Yan and became editor of the Yates County Chronicle. He served as delegate to the Republican State convention in 1884. In 1893, he moved to New York City, where he worked in advertising. He declined the Democratic nomination as candidate for the New York State Assembly in 1910.

He was elected as an Independent (non-Tammany) Democrat to represent Bronx district in the Sixty-second Congress in 1910. Ayres served one term from March 4, 1911 to March 3, 1913.  In 1912 he was an unsuccessful candidate for reelection to the Sixty-third Congress.

Ayres wrote several books and many history articles, and lectured at the New York University Summer School in 1914.

He engaged in the cultivation of oranges at Clearwater, Florida in winter and in the real estate business at Woodstock, New York during the summer.

Death
Steven Beckwith Ayres died on June 1, 1929 in Manhattan's Park West Hospital. He is interred at Clearwater Cemetery in Clearwater, Florida.

References

External links

 

Members of the United States House of Representatives from New York (state)
1861 births
1929 deaths
American male writers
Politicians from New York City
Writers from New York City
Syracuse University alumni
People from Clearwater, Florida
Politicians from Elmira, New York
People from Penn Yan, New York
People from Woodstock, New York
Politicians from Fort Dodge, Iowa
Burials in Florida
New York (state) Democrats
New York (state) Independents
New York (state) Republicans
Independent Democrat members of the United States House of Representatives
20th-century American politicians